Appeal to the Great Spirit is a 1908 equestrian statue by Cyrus Dallin, located in front of the Museum of Fine Arts, Boston. It portrays a Native American on horseback facing skyward, his arms spread wide in a spiritual request to the Great Spirit. It was the last of Dallin's four prominent sculptures of Indigenous people known as The Epic of the Indian, which also include A Signal of Peace (1890), The Medicine Man (1899), and Protest of the Sioux (1904).

A statuette of Appeal to the Great Spirit is in the permanent collection of the White House and was exhibited in President Bill Clinton's Oval Office. British Prime Minister Rt. Hon. David Lloyd George also had a statuette, which he received in association with a meeting with Sioux Chief Two Eagle during an October 1923 tour of the US and Canada

History
Having grown up in Utah, the young Dallin frequently interacted with Native American children, who gave him insights that he called upon while creating this and other works. For Appeal to the Great Spirit , the model was Antonio Corsi, who posed for several great painters and sculptors of the era.

Appeal to the Great Spirit was cast in Paris, and won a gold medal for its exhibition in the Paris Salon. On January 23, 1912, it was installed outside the main entrance to the Boston Museum of Fine Arts (MFA). The installation was originally intended to be temporary, but the statue was never removed, and eventually came to be considered as an iconic symbol of the MFA.

A restoration of the original Boston version was reversed at Dallin's request, because he preferred the light green tones that had developed on the equestrian sculpture over time rather than the typical "statuary brown" patina the conservator applied without consulting him.

On March 3, 2019, the MFA convened a public discussion of the artwork among five art historians and museum curators; two of the panelists were also members of Native American tribes. In October 2019, as part of its first community celebration of Indigenous Peoples' Day, the MFA surrounded its iconic statue with placards displaying questions and comments submitted by the community, including Native Americans. In 2020, the MFA website posted two brief essays written by Native Americans commenting on the sculpture and its cultural meanings.

In 2021, two temporary art installations were placed around and near to the sculpture. Raven Reshapes Boston: A Native Corn Garden at the MFA, by Elizabeth James-Perry, (Aquinnah Wampanoag, b. 1973), consists of corn, beans, and sedges planted in a small garden completely surrounding the statue. Ekua Holmes (African American, b. 1955), planted a large patch of sunflowers close by, called Radiant Community, as part of her ongoing Roxbury Sunflower Project.

Other versions
There is a full-scale replica in Muncie, Indiana, in the intersection of Walnut and Granville streets in the Wysor Heights Historic District; it is considered by many residents to be a symbol of the city. The statue was erected "In Loving Memory of Edmund Burke Ball" by "His Wife and Children".

An edition of nine  bronzes of Appeal to the Great Spirit was produced around 1922. One was the centerpiece of the Tower Room of Dartmouth College's Baker Tower, the college's main library and most iconic building, but has since been removed.

A plaster example in this one-third scale is at the Cyrus Dallin Museum in Arlington, Massachusetts, and another is in the Rockwell Museum in Corning, New York. Central High School in Tulsa, Oklahoma, possesses another plaster example, which was used in 1985 as the model for a bronze version. The casting was done by American Artbronze Fine Arts Foundry under the direction of Howard R. Kirsch. The bronze is now installed in Woodward Park in Tulsa, Oklahoma, at the intersection of 21st Street and Peoria.

Examples of the  bronze statuette are at the White House, the US Department of State, and many American museums.

An  miniature edition was produced by the Gorham Manufacturing Company in 1913; in 2009, No. 263 sold for $9,375.

In popular culture

 An early instance of the sculpture's place in American culture is its appearance (as photographed by Baldwin Coolidge) on the cover of "A-M-E-R-I-C-A" (1917), a World War I song by May Greene and Billy Lang and published by D. W. Cooper.
 The sculpture is used as the logo for the Beach Boys' vanity record label Brother Records. It was first seen in the lower-left corner on the band's 1967 album Smiley Smile and its attending single "Heroes and Villains", and was used more prominently on the cover of their 1973 album The Beach Boys in Concert. When Beach Boy Carl Wilson was asked in 1975 why the group used this as their logo, he said the Indian was chosen because Brian, Dennis, and Carl's grandfather believed that there was a spiritual Indian "guide" who watched over them from the "other side". The choice of the logo was Brian's. Carl called the logo "The Last Horizon".
 A painting of the sculpture appears on the cover of the album The Time Is Near (1970) by the rock group Keef Hartley Band.
 A painting of the sculpture appears on the cover of the album Spirit of God (1984) by the Native American Gospel recording artist Johnny P. Curtis.
 A painting of the sculpture appears on the cover of the album Lysol (1992) by rock group The Melvins.
 In the vinyl release of Directions to See a Ghost (2008) by the American rock band The Black Angels, the poster inside features a skeleton form of this sculpture with a psychedelic background.

See also
 Art in the White House

References

External links

Wikimapia: Appeal to the Great Spirit locations
Save Outdoor Sculpture Survey for Boston Sculpture
Save Outdoor Sculpture Survey for Muncie Sculpture
Save Outdoor Sculpture Survey for Oklahoma City Sculpture
Cyrus E. Dallin Museum Arlington, Massachusetts

Equestrian statues in Massachusetts
Sculptures of Native Americans
Outdoor sculptures in Boston
Outdoor sculptures in Indiana
1908 sculptures
Sculptures of the Museum of Fine Arts, Boston
Sculptures of men in Massachusetts
1909 establishments in Massachusetts
Art in the White House
Works by Cyrus Edwin Dallin
Fenway–Kenmore